Svyatyi Mykolai Battalion (translated: Saint Nicholas Battalion), also known as Mykolaiv Battalion, is a special police battalion from Mykolaiv Oblast. The formation was established on 5 May 2014 in Mykolaiv during the 2014 pro-Russian unrest in Ukraine, which led to separatist movements in southern and eastern regions of Ukraine. Volunteers for the Battalion had to be aged 18 to 50 years. In May 2014, its task was to man roadblocks on the outskirts of Mykolaiv. On 11 July 2014, they began operating in Luhansk Oblast during the war in Donbass. The unit updates its own equipment through a charity foundation, obtaining a Kamaz truck and bulletproof vests.

See also
List of special law enforcement units

References

History of Mykolaiv Oblast
Special tasks patrol police of Ukraine
Military units and formations established in 2014
2014 establishments in Ukraine
History of Luhansk Oblast